Dahlia Seed (1992–1996) was an influential indie rock/post-hardcore band from the New York City/New Jersey area, that was instrumental in defining the sound which is now termed Emo.

Beginning
Dahlia Seed began in the summer of 1992, in the northern New Jersey suburbs as a four-piece band that played a tight, and aggressive version of the indie pop that was prevalent at the time. With all the musicians having a background in the New York hardcore scene, the sound of Dahlia Seed was a bit tougher than the other indie stalwarts of the era, but the most distinctive aspect was the vocals of Tracy Wilson. Her "in your face" vocal style and delivery, coupled with a raw, and honest "open book" lyrical narrative, made her one of the most unusual vocalists of the scene.

Dahlia Seed added a second guitarist (Jon Procopio) in 1993 and proceeded to release their first record, a 10-inch split w/Brokenmouth. It wasn't until their third single, a split 7-inch with Greyhouse, that the band started to gain some real notice and popularity. Their side of the split, a song called "Milk", won them new fans, especially from the tight-knit, and clique-ish Riot Grrrl scene.

Rising popularity
1994 saw the release of "Valentine Kid's Litter", a full-length LP/CD culled from various demo recordings done in 1993. While the sound was a bit dated on the LP, it did give fans something more than split singles, and one-off compilation tracks to listen to. Jon Procopio left the band in summer 1994 and was replaced with Mike O'Keefe on guitar.
Dahlia Seed played extensively in 1994 and early 1995, with such varied acts as Archers of Loaf, Everclear, Built to Spill, Texas is the Reason, Avail, Los Crudos, Heavens to Betsy, etc., and in the summer of 1995, headed off to Philadelphia to record their first proper record "Survived By". Although "Survived By" is considered by many to be the quintessential Dahlia Seed record because it captures the band at its zenith of songwriting, and performance, the overall production of the record betrays the undeniable power of Dahlia Seed as a live act and tends to leave the listener a bit underwhelmed.

Breakup
After production wrapped on "Survived By", Dahlia Seed headed out on their first ill-fated US/Canadian tour. Two weeks into the tour, guitarist Mike O'Keefe unexpectedly quit the band, which brought the tour to a halt somewhere in the mid-west of America. Dahlia Seed returned home to re-group and added a new guitarist Kevin McManus.
With the addition of Kevin McManus, 1996 became a banner year for Dahlia Seed. "Survived By" was released in the spring to much praise, and critical acclaim, and shortly after that the band set out on a very successful U.S. tour.
Upon return from the tour, the members of Dahlia Seed decided that it was time to call it quits, and finished up their run in August 1996, with a sold-out farewell show at Maxwell's in Hoboken, New Jersey Some reports had fans as far away as Toronto, and Chicago making the trip for the show, only to be turned away at the door.
In 1999, Dahlia Seed's parting shot to the world was the release of "Please Excuse All The Blood". This CD was a posthumous release that compiled all the singles, comp tracks, and unreleased material that Dahlia Seed had left scattered about during their four years, including the last three recordings Dahlia Seed did, (with Alap Momin of Dalek fame), before their break-up. The songs "Standing 8 Count", "Greg Leto's Tears", and a cover of VoiVod's "Missing Sequences" are considered by fans to be some of the band's best work, and serve as a lament to what the future might have held for the band.

Post-Dahlia Seed
Tracy Wilson has also recorded under the name Ringfinger.  Under this moniker she has released the vinyl-only LP Decimal.  The album features collaborations with members of Cave In, Isis, Sunn O))), Jessamine, Fontanelle, Film School, Denali, Engine Down, and Dälek.

Previous members
Tracy Wilson – vocals
Chris Skelly – Guitar
Darin Galgano – drums
Brian Getkin – Bass
Mike O'Keefe – Guitar
Kevin McManus – Guitar
Jon Procopio – Guitar

Discography
Valentine Kid's Litter (1994)
Survived By (1995)
Please Excuse All the Blood (1997)

References

External links
Dahlia Seed Official Website

American post-hardcore musical groups
Rock music groups from New Jersey
Musical groups established in 1992
Musical groups disestablished in 1996